Malchiodi is an Italian surname. Notable people with the surname include:

 Andrea Malchiodi (born 1972), an Italian mathematician
 Antonio Malchiodi (1848–1915), an Italian painter
 Alfred C. Malchiodi (1942–2011), an American engineer specializing in submarines
 Cathy Malchiodi (born 1953), American art therapist and academic
 Emilio Malchiodi (1922–1997),  an Argentine athlete

See also 
 Asteroid 16091 Malchiodi